Frederick Arthur Lewis (26 July 1923 – 1975) was an English footballer who played in the Football League as a full-back for Chelsea and Colchester United.

Career

Born in Broughton Gifford, and subsequently brought up in Aylesbury Lewis signed for Football League club Chelsea from the Royal Navy after World War II in 1946. He had previously played for Aylesbury United in the English non-leagues.

After signing for Chelsea in March 1946, and with the Football League recommencing with a full programme for the 1946–47 season, Lewis made his First Division debut on 31 August 1946 in a 4–3 victory over Bolton Wanderers at Stamford Bridge. He would go on to make 33 First team appearances (include 10 appearances on Summer tours to Malta, Italy and Switzerland ) for the club between 1946 and 1953, spending the majority of his time with Chelsea in the Football Combination reserve team. He played his final match for the club on 30 August 1952 in a 2–0 home victory over Portsmouth.

Lewis joined Colchester United from Chelsea in July 1953 and made his debut on the opening day of the 1953–54 season in a 3–1 win over Torquay United at Layer Road. In two seasons with the club, Lewis played a total of 89 league games for the U's, failing to score. He played his final game for Colchester and his final professional game on the final day of the 1954–55 season, ironically against Torquay, but on this occasion, the result was a 2–1 win for Torquay. After leaving United, Lewis moved to non-league Headington United. After retiring from professional football Lewis became coach to Aylesbury United

Frederick Lewis died in 1975.

References

External links

1923 births
1975 deaths
20th-century Royal Navy personnel
Military personnel from Wiltshire
People from Wiltshire
English footballers
Association football fullbacks
Aylesbury United F.C. players
Chelsea F.C. players
Colchester United F.C. players
Oxford United F.C. players
English Football League players
Royal Navy personnel of World War II